= Selasee =

Ghanaian musician

Selasee is a World Music/Reggae artist from Ghana who lives in Boulder, Colorado most of the time. Counting Bob Marley and Nat King Cole as inspirations, his music approaches complex and often profound subjects with grace, simplicity and catchy melodies.

His song "Run" was featured on one of the world's best-selling video games, FIFA 2006. In 2006 he won the following awards:

"Run" won 1st prize for in the World Music category and 2nd in the People's Choice Award at the ISC (International Songwriting Competition).

At the Billboard World Songwriting Competition, Selasee's song "Agba Yei" received an honorable mention. In early 2009, "Agba Yei" also won in The 8th Annual Independent Music Awards for Best World Fusion Song. In January 2011, Selasee was nominated in The 10th Annual Independent Music Awards for his song "Saidaway" in the World Beat Song category.

And finally, Selasee was a finalist in the World Music category at the John Lennon Songwriting Contest, Session 1.

Selasee released his second album "African Gate" in 2010, the first demo for which has already been licensed to EA Sports for their "Cricket 2007" video game.

From his teenage years, when he started writing and performing gospel music with a local church group, Selasee has always been driven by a desire to share his music with the world. In 1999 he graduated from a 3-year music program at the school of performing arts at the University of Ghana in Legon.

That same year he made the big move to America. After a short while in Utah and in southern California – during which he worked variety of odd jobs as well as composing tunes and performing at coffee houses and some restaurants and few workshops – he finally moved to Colorado, where he formed his band. His current band, Selasee and the Fafa Family, a 7-piece band, are currently recognized as the hottest local Colorado reggae/world music bands in town. Selasee is releasing his third album September 2014 with Selasee and the Fafa Family.

== Discography ==
- Run (2006)
- "African Gate" (2010)
